Greggory William Olson (born October 11, 1966) is an American former professional baseball player, coach, scout and television sports commentator. He played in Major League Baseball as a right-handed pitcher from  through , most prominently as a member of the Baltimore Orioles where he established himself as one of the premier relief pitchers in the American League (AL). He set an Orioles team record of 41 consecutive scoreless innings and,  he holds the team record for career saves. 

During Olson's major league tenure, he also played for the Atlanta Braves, Cleveland Indians, Kansas City Royals, Detroit Tigers, Houston Astros, Minnesota Twins, Arizona Diamondbacks and Los Angeles Dodgers. In 2008, Olson was inducted into the Baltimore Orioles Hall of Fame and, in 2021 he was inducted into the National College Baseball Hall of Fame.

High school and college
Olson attended Omaha Northwest High School in Omaha, Nebraska, where he was a pitcher and led the Huskies to four straight state titles. His father, Bill Olson, was his high school coach. Olson appeared in Sports Illustrated'''s "Faces In The Crowd" section for the 07-16-84 Vol 61, No. 3.

In the state championship game of his senior year, Olson threw a no-hitter.

After graduating from high school in 1985, Olson went on to pitch at Auburn University for three seasons.

Professional career
Olson was drafted by the Orioles in the 1st round (4th pick) of the 1988 amateur draft, and was given a $200,000 signing bonus before making his major league debut on September 2, 1988. A reliever, he threw what baseball historian Sheldon Stewart referred to as a "blazing fastball and devastating curve".

In 1989, Olson became the first reliever to win the American League Rookie of the Year Award. Olson also set an American League rookie record with 27 saves, and had a 5-2 mark with a 1.69 ERA and 90 strikeouts in 85 innings.

Selected to the All-Star team in 1990, Olson set a club record of 37 saves during the season and collected 31 and 36 in the next two years. On July 13, 1991, Olson combined with 3 other Baltimore pitchers in a no-hitter against the Oakland Athletics.  In August 1993, Olson suffered a torn elbow ligament injury that sidelined him for the rest of the year.  He finished with 29 saves and a career low 1.60 ERA, but Baltimore opted not to take a risk with him and signed Lee Smith as their new closer. Olson struggled with a succession of injuries over the next years, playing for seven different teams from 1994-97.

 In 1998, Olson enjoyed a fruitful comeback with the expansion Arizona Diamondbacks. He set a franchise record of 30 saves (broken by Byung-hyun Kim in 2002) and was also part of a rare feat. On May 28, with Arizona leading the San Francisco Giants 8-5, Olson began the bottom of the ninth inning by striking out Darryl Hamilton, but the Giants then loaded the bases with two walks and a hit before Stan Javier had an RBI grounder that made it 8-6. After pinch-hitter J. T. Snow walked to load the bases, manager Buck Showalter ordered Olson to intentionally walk Barry Bonds, forcing home a run, and bringing up Brent Mayne, who worked the count full before he lined to right field for the third out. Olson put together one of the strangest saves imaginable, working around six walks in 1.1 innings. He threw 49 pitches (not counting the bases-loaded intentional walk) and only 22 of them were for strikes. Olson's only Major League hit was a home run during his last official at-bat of the 1998 season.

Olson was replaced by new closer Matt Mantei in 1999. He finished his career as a setup man for the Dodgers.

In a 14-year career, Olson compiled 217 saves with a 40-39 record, 588 strikeouts, and a 3.46 ERA in 672 innings pitched.

Post-retirement
On March 19, 2008, Olson was elected to the Baltimore Orioles Hall of Fame, and was inducted during a pre-game ceremony at Oriole Park at Camden Yards on August 9, 2008.  He is currently a scout for the San Diego Padres.

In 2016, Olson served as pitching coach to actress Kylie Bunbury, who played "Ginny Baker" on the scripted FOX television series Pitch''.

From 2017 to 2020 Olson was a color analyst for Orioles broadcasts on MASN.

On March 29, 2021, Olson announced he had been diagnosed with prostate cancer.

Notes and references

External links

Gregg Olson - Baseballbiography.com

1966 births
Arizona Diamondbacks players
Atlanta Braves players
Auburn Tigers baseball players
Baltimore Orioles players
Cleveland Indians players
Detroit Tigers players
Houston Astros players
Kansas City Royals players
Los Angeles Dodgers players
Minnesota Twins players
American League All-Stars
Major League Baseball Rookie of the Year Award winners
Living people
Major League Baseball pitchers
Baseball players from Nebraska
People from Scribner, Nebraska
Hagerstown Suns players
Charlotte Knights players
Richmond Braves players
Omaha Royals players
Buffalo Bisons (minor league) players
Indianapolis Indians players
San Bernardino Stampede players
San Diego Padres scouts
Albuquerque Dukes players
Baseball players at the 1987 Pan American Games
Pan American Games silver medalists for the United States
Pan American Games medalists in baseball
All-American college baseball players
Medalists at the 1987 Pan American Games
Major League Baseball broadcasters
Baltimore Orioles announcers